Stuart Brace (born 21 September 1942) is a former professional footballer played as a winger or forward. He scored 155 goals from 423 games in the Football League, playing for Plymouth Argyle, Watford, Mansfield Town, Peterborough United, Grimsby Town (206 league games), Southend United, and Falmouth Town. He also played Second XI cricket for Somerset while at Plymouth Argyle.

References

External links
Interview with Brace on Grimsby Town fansite Sing When We're Fishing

1942 births
Living people
Sportspeople from Taunton
English footballers
Association football wingers
Association football forwards
Plymouth Argyle F.C. players
Watford F.C. players
Mansfield Town F.C. players
Peterborough United F.C. players
Grimsby Town F.C. players
Southend United F.C. players
Falmouth Town A.F.C. players